Shapeshifting is the seventeenth studio album by guitarist Joe Satriani, released on April 10, 2020, through Sony Music. Satriani co-produced the album with Jim Scott, with it featuring a "wide variety of styles". The album was preceded by the lead single "Nineteen Eighty". This is Satriani's last album to be released through Sony Music, as he had switched labels to earMUSIC for his next album, The Elephants of Mars (2022).

Track listing

Personnel
 Joe Satriani – guitars, banjo, keyboards, whistling, handclaps 
 Chris Chaney – bass guitar, rhythm guitar (track 10)
 Eric Caudieux – keyboards, percussion, whistling, handclaps, editing, sound designing 
 Kenny Aronoff – drums
 Lisa Coleman – piano (tracks 11 and 13)
 Christopher Guest – mandolin (track 13)
 Jim Scott – percussion, whistling, handclaps, producing, recording, mixing
 John Cuniberti – mastering

Charts

See also
 List of 2020 albums

References

2020 albums
Joe Satriani albums
Albums produced by Jim Scott (producer)